Long John Baldry & Friends is a 1987 live album (recorded in-studio) by Blues singer Long John Baldry.

Background

On Sunday, September 14, 1986, Mushroom Recording Studios was transformed into the ‘Mushroom Bistro and Lounge’ for a celebratory live recording to mark Long John Baldry’s 30th year in the music business. The audience were invited and consisted of both friends and fans.

The album was only available as a free mail order exclusive. Baldry’s previous Music Line album, Silent Treatment, included a mail order slip. The album was free to fans who paid the $4.75 manufacturing and postage costs. Each album came signed by Long John Baldry.

The complete ‘Long John Baldry & Friends’ album was released on CD in 1987 as bonus tracks on the Plane Records release of ‘Silent Treatment’.

The album would receive a wider release in 1988 as it was used as the bulk of the ‘A Touch of the Blues’ album. This record was initially only available in Canada and had a very limited pressing. A CD version was released in France on Voodoo Records in 1990.

Track listing 

Side one

 "Goin' Down Slow" (James Burke Oden) – 5:23
 "I Got My Mojo Workin'" (Preston Foster) – 5:24
 "Spoonful" (Willie Dixon) – 4:28

Side two

 "Rake and Ramblin' Boy" (Traditional arranged by Baldry) – 3:45
 "Black Girl" (Traditional arranged by Lead Belly) – 3:38
 "Good Morning Blues" (Huddie Ledbetter) – 4:19

Personnel 
 Long John Baldry – vocals, 6 string & 12 string guitars
 Kathi McDonald – vocals
 Papa John King – guitar
 Butch Coulter – harmonica
 Mike Lent – double bass

Technical
 Jimmy Horowitz – producer
 Rolf Henneman – engineer
 Dennett Woodland – assistant engineer
 Gary Taylor – executive producer
 Mark Montizambert – photography
 Jerry Foster – designer

Long John Baldry albums
1987 live albums